is located in the Daisetsuzan National Park, Hokkaidō, Japan. It is an andesitic stratovolcano.

References

External links

Mountains of Hokkaido
Volcanoes of Hokkaido
Biei, Hokkaido
Stratovolcanoes of Japan
Pleistocene stratovolcanoes